Ryazan Oblast is a federal subject of Russia (an oblast). Its administrative center is the city of Ryazan, which is the oblast's largest city.

Geography

Ryazan Oblast borders Vladimir Oblast (N), Nizhny Novgorod Oblast (NE), the Republic of Mordovia (E), Penza Oblast (SE), Tambov Oblast (S), Lipetsk Oblast (SW), Tula Oblast (W), and Moscow Oblast (NW).

In terms of physical geography, Ryazan Oblast lies in the central part of the Russian Plain between the Central Russian and Volga uplands. The terrain is flat, with the highest point of no more than 300 m above sea level. Soils are podzolic and boggy on the left bank of the Oka, changing southward to more fertile podzolic and leached black-earths (chernozyom).

Hydrography

Most of the Ryazan Oblast lies within the Volga basin, with the Oka the principal river of the area.

History

Human occupation of the area of the Ryazan Oblast dates from at least the Upper Paleolithic period. East Slavs, Volga Finnic, Tatar tribes inhabited the area and merged into an ethnos,  a process virtually completed by the 13th century CE.  In 830 the Ryazan area became part of Rus' Khaganate.

Later the Ryazan area became part of the Kievan Rus' political system and came under the domination of the Principality of Chernigov (founded in 988). The Principality of Ryazan operated as a separate entity from 1097 to 1521, when the area became part of the Grand Duchy of Moscow, though with the Qasim Khanate district retaining some autonomy until the 1550s.

The Ryazan Governorate became separate from the Moscow Governorate in 1796.

Soviet Union 
Ryazan Oblast was formed out of the Moscow and Voronezh oblasts in 1937. It took its present form in 1954 when some of its southern districts were ceded to the newly established Lipetsk Oblast. Also in 1954, it was ceded parts of southern Moscow Oblast and no border changes happened afterward.

Administrative divisions

Economy

Soviet Union 
In the post-war period of the Soviet Union recovery in the wake of growing competition between USSR and US several ambitios plans severely undermined economical stability of the region. In Ryazan Oblast, at the behest of central government led by Nikita Khrushchev a regional administration ordered slaughter of livestock in a futile attempt to boost productivity rates (plans included tripling of meat and milk production). Because of series of misjudgement and overestimations these plans resulted in disastrous failure which is known today as Ryazan miracle.

Modern 

Ryazan Oblast is a part of the Central economic region. The oblast is economically favorable due to the water and land routes that pass through it and provide stable domestic and foreign economic ties.  It is considered both an industrial and agricultural Oblast. The agriculture in the region is represented by livestock farming and plants cultivation. Livestock farming specializes in raising and fattening cattle and breeding pigs, sheep, and poultry. Beekeeping is also well developed in the region.

Transportation
Solotchinskoye peat narrow gauge railway is located in Ryazansky District
Mesherskoye peat narrow gauge railway is located in Klepikovsky District

Demographics
Population: 

2012
Births: 12 351 (10.8 per 1000)
Deaths: 18 723 (16.3 per 1000)
Total fertility rate:
2009 - 1.42 | 2010 - 1.44 | 2011 - 1.45 | 2012 - 1.54 | 2013 - 1.55 | 2014 - 1.60 | 2015 - 1.64 | 2016 - 1.70(e)

Ethnic composition (2010):
Russians - 95.1%
Ukrainians - 0.8%
Armenians - 0.5%
Mordvins - 0.5%
Tatars - 0.5%
Azeris - 0.4%
Uzbeks - 0.3%
Others - 1.9%
74,419 people were registered from administrative databases, and could not declare an ethnicity. It is estimated that the proportion of ethnicities in this group is the same as that of the declared group.

Religion

According to a 2012 survey 63% of the population of Ryazan Oblast adheres to the Russian Orthodox Church, 3% are unaffiliated generic Christians, 1% are Orthodox Christian believers without belonging to church or belonging to non-Russian Orthodox churches, 1% are Muslims, and 1% are adherents of the Rodnovery (Slavic native faith) movement. In addition, 15% of the population declares to be "spiritual but not religious", 9% is atheist, and 7% follows other religions or did not give an answer to the question.

Tourism 

 , an 18th century mansion built by wealthy local trader and farmer.

Notable people

Arts
 Alexander Alexandrov (1883–1946), composer
 Erast Garin (1902–1980), comic actor
 Alexander Genis (born 1953), writer, broadcaster and cultural critic
 Yuri Kholopov (1932–2003), musicologist, music theorist, doctor of arts, and professor of the Moscow Conservatoire
 Maximilian Kravkov (1887–1937), writer
 Andrei Mironov (born 1975), painter
 Konstantin Paustovsky (1892–1968), writer
 Alexander Pirogov (1899–1964), bass opera singer
 Yakov Polonsky (1819–1898), writer
 Mikhail Saltykov-Shchedrin (1826–1889), satirist
 Aleksandr Solzhenitsyn (1918–2008), writer
 Sergei Yesenin (1895–1925), poet
 Semen Zhivago (1807–1863), historical painter

Athletics
 Anton Belov (born 1986), professional ice hockey defenceman
 Olga Kaliturina (born 1976), high jumper
 Maria Kalmykova (born 1978), basketball player
 Yuri Kuleshov (born 1981), professional football defensive midfielder
 Irina Meleshina (born 1982), long jumper
 Ivan Nifontov (born 1987), judoka
 Sergei Panov (born 1970), basketball player
 Konstantin Selyavin (born 1974), former Russian professional football player
 Kirill Sosunov (born 1975), long jumper
 Alexandra Trusova (born 2004), figure skater

Engineering and science
 Andrey Arkhangelsky (1879–1940), geologist
 Victor Balykin (born 1947), Russian physicist
 Vladimir Gulevich (1867–1933), biochemist
 Aleksei Kozhevnikov (1836–1902), neurologist and psychiatrist
 Nikolai Kravkov (1865–1924), pharmacologist
 Sergey P. Kravkov (1873–1938), soil scientist
 Sergey V. Kravkov (1893–1951), psychologist and psychophysiologist
 Andrey Markov (1856–1922), mathematician
 Ivan Michurin (1855–1935), biologist
 Sergey Nepobedimy (1921–2014), designer of rocket weaponry
 Ivan Pavlov (1849–1936), physiologist
 Konstantin Tsiolkovsky (1857–1935), engineer

Others
 Dmitry Andreikin (born 1990), chess grandmaster
 Roman Putin (born 1977), businessman

References

Notes

Sources

 
States and territories established in 1937